Omladinski Fudbalski Klub Gradina Srebrenik is a professional association football club from the city of Srebrenik that is situated in the northeastern part of Bosnia and Herzegovina.

The club currently plays in the First League of the Federation of Bosnia and Herzegovina.

History
OFK Gradina was founded in 1953 in a karaoke bar within the city of Srebrenik. The logo of the club has the traditional Lilium Bosniacum placed in the central part of the logo.

After the collapse of Yugoslavia, Gradina played in the first six seasons of the top level First League of Bosnia and Herzegovina. From 2000 however, they have yoyo-ed between the second and third tiers of the Bosnian football pyramid with only one more season in the Premier League in the 2012–13 season. Currently, Gradina is active in the second tier-First League of the Federation of Bosnia and Herzegovina and plays its home matches on the Gradski Stadion (City Stadium) in Srebrenik, which has a capacity of 5,000 seats.

Honours

Domestic

League
First League of the Federation of Bosnia and Herzegovina:
Winners (1): 2011–12
Second League of the Federation of Bosnia and Herzegovina:
Winners (3): 2004–05 , 2009–10 , 2020–21

Club seasons
Source:

Managerial history
 Samir Adanalić (July 1, 2010 – August 27, 2012)
 Denis Sadiković (August 29, 2012 – September 19, 2012)
 Boris Gavran (September 20, 2012 – September 24, 2012)
 Nedžad Bajrović (September 24, 2012 – October 10, 2012)
 Fuad Grbešić (October 11, 2012 – January 12, 2013)
 Nedžad Bajrović (January 13, 2013 – May 13, 2013)
 Vinko Divković (May 14, 2013 – June 30, 2013)
 Fuad Grbešić (July 2, 2013 – July 5, 2014)
 Nedžad Bajrović (July 8, 2014 – November 10, 2014)
 Smajil Karić (March 26, 2015 – June 30, 2015)
 Samir Adanalić (July 1, 2015 – December 31, 2016)
 Fuad Grbešić (July 15, 2017 – March 28, 2018)
 Samir Adanalić (March 29, 2018 – February 27, 2019)
 Suad Jašarević (February 27, 2019 – June 25, 2020)
 Samir Adanalić (June 25, 2020 – present)

References

External links
NK Gradina at Facebook

 
Srebrenik
Association football clubs established in 1963
Sport in the Federation of Bosnia and Herzegovina
1963 establishments in Bosnia and Herzegovina
Football clubs in Bosnia and Herzegovina